Phayom Chulanont (12 March 1909 – 7 September 1980) was a Thai military officer, politician, and leader of the Communist Party of Thailand. He was the father of former Prime Minister Surayud Chulanont.

Biography 
The son of Phraya Wiset Singhanat of Phetburi, and son-in-law of Phraya Sri Sitthi Songkhram, Phayom became an ally of Marshal Plaek Pibulsonggram in his coup against the government of Thawal Thamrong Navaswadhi and Pridi Bhanomyong in 1947. He later disagreed with the leaders of the junta and started a failed coup of his own, the so-called Army Staff School coup. When the coup failed, he fled to China via Mae Sai and Burma. At the time, his son, Surayud, was only six-years-old.

Phayom returned to Thailand in 1957 to run in the general elections in March, becoming MP of Phetburi. Later that year, Sarit Dhanarajata seized power from the government of Plaek Pibulsonggram. Phayom subsequently left his family and went underground, adopting the nom de guerre Comrade Too Khamtan. He later became a member of the Central Committee of the Communist Party of Thailand and the Chief of Staff of the People's Liberation Army of Thailand. His son, Surayud, later joined the Royal Thai Army and led operations against his father.

After decades of hiding and guerilla warfare, Phayom's health failed him. He was sent to recuperate in Beijing in 1978, and later died in China on 7 September 1980.

References

Citations

Sources 
 Nation Weekender,  ('Comrade Khamtan', A Good Man in the Heart of General Surayud), 9 December 2005 

Phayom Chulanont
Phayom Chulanont
1909 births
1980 deaths
People of the Cold War
Phayom Chulanont
Phayom Chulanont
Phayom Chulanont
Phayom Chulanont
Phayom Chulanont
Phayom Chulanont